Hungchi (also known as Chakhung) is a mountain peak in the Himalayas on the border of Nepal and the Tibet Autonomous Region of People's Republic of China.

Location 
To the east, the ridge continues over to the Chumbu and Pumori.

Climbing history 
Hungchi was first climbed on April 19, 2003, by a Japanese expedition.

References 

Mountains of the Himalayas
Mountains of Nepal